"Palesteena", or, "Lena from Palesteena", was a 1920 song, with lyrics by Con Conrad, and music by J. Russell Robinson.

Background

It was originally recorded and performed by the Original Dixieland Jass Band, a band of New Orleans jazz musicians, who released it as an instrumental as a Victor 78, 18717-B, in 1920. The A side was "Margie", a jazz and pop standard, paired in a medley with "Singin' the Blues". J. Russel Robinson, the pianist in the ODJB, co-wrote the music for all three songs.  The song was published by Shapiro, Bernstein & Company in New York in 1920.  The melody has a strong Klezmer influence, with the chorus based on a phrase from "Nokh A Bisl" by J. Kammen.  "Lena from Palesteena" is one of a number of novelty songs of the era with a near-Eastern theme.

Other Recordings

Eddie Cantor and Frank Crumit also recorded the song. Bob Crosby recorded the song on Decca Records in 1938. Vincent Lopez recorded the song on Columbia Records.

Lyrics

Sources

 Stewart, Jack. "The Original Dixieland Jazz Band's Place in the Development of Jazz." New Orleans International Music Colloquium, 2005.
 Lange, Horst H. Wie der Jazz begann: 1916-1923, von der "Original Dixieland Jazz Band" bis zu King Olivers "Creole Jazz Band". Berlin: Colloquium Verlag, 1991. 
 Brunn, H.O. The Story of the Original Dixieland Jazz Band. Baton Rouge: Louisiana State University Press, 1960. Reprinted by Da Capo Press, 1977.

References

External links
 "Palesteena" by the ODJB on the Jazz Anthology website.
 

Original Dixieland Jass Band songs
1920 songs
1921 singles
Jazz compositions
Jazz songs
Songs with music by Con Conrad
Eddie Cantor songs